The Bartók Quartet is a Hungarian string quartet ensemble, founded in 1963 in Budapest as the successor ensemble of the Komlós Quartet (1957–63).

Their repertoire includes especially works of the Viennese Classicism and Béla Bartók as well as contemporary Hungarian composers.

History 
The Bartók Quartet is the successor ensemble of the Komlós Quartet which was founded in 1957 by students of the Franz Liszt Academy of Music.

In 1963, the ensemble was renamed the Bartók Quartet and had its first great success when it won 1st prize at the 1964 International String Quartet Competition in Liège.

The Bartók Quartet has participated in international music festivals, as well as outstanding ceremonies such as the opening of the world-famous Sydney Opera House and Human Rights Day in New York City at the UN.

The Quartet was awarded the Liszt Prize in 1965, the Kossuth Prize in 1970 and 1997; in 1981 they received the UNESCO Prize and the title, Outstanding Artists. In 1986, the ensemble received the Béla Bartók-Ditta Pásztory Prize.

The recording of the six Bartók String Quartets (Erato Records/EMI) was awarded the "Grand Prix" by European critics. Further recordings followed, including the complete string quartets of Beethoven and Brahms.

Members 
Source:

First violin 
 Péter Komlós (1957–2017)

Second violin 
 Sándor Devich (1957–1982)
 Béla Banfalvy (1982–1985)
 Géza Hargitai (1985–)

Viola 
 Géza Németh (1957–)

Violoncello 
 László Mezö (1957–1960 and 1977–)
 Károly Botvay (1960–1977)

Recordings 
 Johannes Brahms: Streichquintette F-dur op. 88, G-dur op. 111 (Deutsche Schallplatten, 1984)
 Johannes Brahms: Streichsextette B-dur op. 18, G-dur op. 36 (Deutsche Schallplatten, 1985)
 Das Schönste der deutschen Romantik – Chöre, Lieder, Balladen (Delta Music, 1986)
 Sternstunden der Musik (Deutscher Schallplatten-Club, 1987)
 Meditation – [Mehrteiliges Werk] Teil: Vol. 1. (1991)
 Felix Otto Dessoff: Kammermusik (Bella Musica, 1994)
 Klassik Radio – Musik für gewisse Stunden (Bella Musica, 1996)
 Pyotr Ilyich Tchaikovsky – String quartets op. 11 and op. 30 (Andreas Spreer, 2002)
 Meditation – classical relaxation / beautiful harmonies of great classical music (Delta Music, 2002)
 Meditation – Entspannen mit klassischer Musik (Delta Music, 2003)

See also 
 List of string quartets by Béla Bartók

References

Further reading 
 
 Alain Pâris: Lexikon der Interpreten der klassischen Musik im 20. Jahrhundert. dtv-Bärenreiter, Munich/Kassel 1992,

External links 
 
 

Hungarian string quartets
1963 establishments in Hungary
Béla Bartók